Ibadana is a monotypic genus of African dwarf spiders containing the single species, Ibadana cuspidata. It was first described by G. H. Locket & A. Russell-Smith in 1980, and has only been found in Cameroon and Nigeria.

See also
 List of Linyphiidae species (I–P)

References

Linyphiidae
Monotypic Araneomorphae genera
Spiders of Africa